Leyla Alaton is a Turkish businesswoman and art collector, member of the Board of Alarko group of companies. She has been named to that position since 2008. She is also a Board Member of Alvimedica Medical Devices.

Biography
Leyla was born in Istanbul. She is the daughter of İshak Alaton, one of the founders of the Alarko Holding, one of the largest business conglomerates in Turkey, listed on the Istanbul Stock Exchange. Her father died on September 11, 2016.

Alaton studied at Şişli Terakki Primary School, Sainte-Pulchérie French Secondary School and Notre Dame de Sion French High School in Istanbul. She also has a degree in Business Administration and Management from Fairleigh Dickinson University, and completed a master's degree in Social Sciences at the New York University.

Alaton started her entrepreneurial career by selling belts while in the United States. She is a founding member of Kadiger, the Turkish Association of Women Entrepreneurs. She is a popular speaker on women's rights issues and on the role of women in modern Turkey, as well as fostering social entrepreneurship.

In 1993, she was one of the first Leaders of the Future named at the Davos World Economic Forum. In 2014, she was made Chevalier of the French Légion d'honneur.

Art
Alaton is known in Turkey for her extensive collection of contemporary art, from artists both from Turkey and abroad. She is a member of Contemporary Art Istanbul Consultative Committee and the Leadership Council of the New Museum in New York City.

Honours
  :  Chevalier (Knight) of the French Légion d'honneur (1994).

References

Turkish Jews
Turkish people of Swedish descent
Turkish women in business
Turkish businesspeople
Businesspeople from Istanbul
Chevaliers of the Légion d'honneur
20th-century businesswomen
21st-century businesswomen